LaCasse or Lacasse (French pronunciation: [lakas]) is a French surname. Notable people with the surname include:

Alex Lacasse, Canadian pop artist
Cloé Lacasse, Canadian soccer player 
Florent Lacasse (born 1981), French middle distance runner
Geneviève Lacasse (born 1989), Canadian ice hockey player
Josée Lacasse (born 1965), Canadian alpine skier
Josée Lacasse (born 1970), Canadian rugby union player 
Joseph Lacasse (1894–1975), Belgian artist
Joseph-Henri-Gustave Lacasse (1890–1953), Canadian journalist, physician and politician
Ryan LaCasse (born 1983), American football player
Suzanne Lacasse (born 1948), Canadian civil engineer

French-language surnames